Terminalia parviflora is a species of plant in the Combretaceae family. It is endemic to Sri Lanka.

References

Endemic flora of Sri Lanka
parviflora
Vulnerable plants
Taxonomy articles created by Polbot